{{Album ratings
|rev1 = AllMusic
|rev1Score = 
| rev2 = The Encyclopedia of Popular Music
| rev2Score = 
|rev3 = Entertainment Weekly
|rev3Score = B−
|rev4 = The Rolling Stone Album Guide
|rev4Score = 
| rev5 = Select
| rev5Score = <ref>{{cite news|last=Harrison|first=Andrew|date=November 1990 |title=Paula Abdul Shut Up And Dance (The Dance Mixes) |work=Select|page=124}}</ref>

}}Shut Up and Dance: Mixes is a Paula Abdul remix album, released in 1990. It contains dance remixes of the six hit singles from Abdul's debut album Forever Your Girl, one remixed album track and one medley. The album was another huge success for Abdul, peaking at No. 7 on the Billboard 200.

Following Abdul's continued UK singles success throughout 1990, Shut Up and Dance'' was re-released there late in the same year, featuring an additional four tracks.

There were two singles and accompanying music videos released from the project—the "1990 Medley Mix" and "Straight Up (Ultimix mix)".

Track listing

Charts and certifications

Weekly charts

Year-end charts

Certifications and sales

See also
List of best-selling remix albums worldwide

References

Paula Abdul remix albums
1990 remix albums
Virgin Records remix albums